Stavchany is a village in Kamianets-Podilskyi Raion, Khmelnytskyi Oblast, Ukraine. It belongs to Nova Ushytsia settlement hromada, one of the hromadas of Ukraine.

Until 18 July 2020, Stavchany belonged to Nova Ushytsia Raion. The raion was abolished in July 2020 as part of the administrative reform of Ukraine, which reduced the number of raions of Khmelnytskyi Oblast to three.

References

Villages in Kamianets-Podilskyi Raion